Catherine Daufès-Roux (née Roux; born 24 April 1963) is a French LREM politician who was Member of Parliament for Gard's 5th constituency from 28 June 2021 to June 2022.

Biography 
Daufès-Roux was born in Alès and worked as an assistant headteacher.

In the 2017 French legislative election she was the substitute candidate of Olivier Gaillard. She replaced him in Parliament when he became Mayor of Sauve.

She lost her seat in the first round of the 2022 French legislative election. The seat was won by Michel Sala of La France Insoumise (NUPES) in the second round.

References 

Living people
1963 births
People from Gard
French schoolteachers
La République En Marche! politicians
21st-century French women politicians
Women members of the National Assembly (France)
Deputies of the 15th National Assembly of the French Fifth Republic